Haycock Airport  was a public-use airport located in Haycock, which is in the Nome Census Area of the U.S. state of Alaska. The airport was publicly owned by the Alaska Department of Natural Resources.

Facilities and aircraft 
Haycock Airport had one runway designated 15/33 with a gravel and dirt surface measuring 1,750 by 15 feet (533 x 5 m). For the 12-month period ending July 18, 1992, the airport had 300 aircraft operations, an average of 25 per month: 67% air taxi and 33% general aviation.

References

External links
 

Defunct airports in Alaska
Airports in the Nome Census Area, Alaska